Orhan Tasdelen (born 6 February 1987) is a Turkish professional footballer who plays as a defender for 24 Erzincanspor.

Professional career
On 10 May 2018, Orhan helped Akhisar Belediyespor win their first professional trophy, the 2017–18 Turkish Cup.

Honours
Akhisarspor
 Turkish Cup (1): 2017-18

References

External links
Akhisar'da 3 isimle yollar ayrıldı, fanatik.com, 2 January 2016
 TFF Profile
 Soccerway Profile

1987 births
Living people
Sportspeople from Gaziantep
Turkish footballers
Association football defenders
Gaziantepspor footballers
Samsunspor footballers
Kayseri Erciyesspor footballers
Karşıyaka S.K. footballers
Göztepe S.K. footballers
İstanbul Başakşehir F.K. players
Akhisarspor footballers
Adana Demirspor footballers
Giresunspor footballers
24 Erzincanspor footballers
Süper Lig players
TFF First League players
TFF Second League players